Laced/Unlaced is a two-disc instrumental album by Emilie Autumn, released in 2007 by Trisol Music Group. Disc one, "Laced", is a re-release of On a Day..., Autumn's fledgling record, with the addition of several previously unreleased live recordings from her teenage years. Disc two, "Unlaced", contains all electric violin recordings. A limited-edition CD + book set was released on March 9, 2007 with just 2000 copies being printed worldwide, and the jewel case album was re-released on June 15.

Track listing

References

2007 albums
Emilie Autumn albums
Concept albums